Navtej Singh Johar (born 8 August 1959) is an Indian Sangeet Natak Akademi award-winning Bharatnatyam exponent and choreographer. He is also an LGBTQ activist.

Life and career 
Johar is faculty at Ashoka University, Sonipat. He is trained in Bharatanatyam at Kalakshetra, a dance school of Rukmini Arundale at Chennai, and with Leela Samson at the Shriram Bharatiya Kala Kendra in New Delhi. He also studied later at the Department of Performance Studies, New York University. He has received numerous fellowships for his research such as Times of India Fellowship (1995), the Charles Wallace Fellowship (1999).

Johar has collaborated with composers Stephen Rush, Shubha Mudgal and installation artist Sheba Chhachhi among others. He has also acted in Earth by Deepa Mehta and Khamosh Pani by Sabiha Sumar.

He is among the few male dancers of classical form in India and first Sikh to have taken to the art form.

Activism 

In June 2016, Johar and five others, all members of the LGBT community themselves, filed a writ petition in the Supreme Court of India challenging Section 377 of the Indian Penal Code. This resulted in the 2018 landmark judgment in Navtej Singh Johar and others v. Union of India in which the Supreme Court unanimously declared the law unconstitutional "in so far as it criminalizes consensual sexual conduct between adults of the same sex".

References

1959 births
Indian choreographers
Punjabi people
Bharatanatyam exponents
Living people
LGBT choreographers
Indian LGBT people
Indian LGBT rights activists
21st-century LGBT people
Recipients of the Sangeet Natak Akademi Award